The 133rd Air Refueling Squadron (133 ARS) is a unit of the New Hampshire Air National Guard 157th Air Refueling Wing located at Pease Air National Guard Base, Portsmouth, New Hampshire, United States. The 133rd, which previously operated the KC-135 Stratotanker, received its first KC-46A Pegasus tanker on 8 August 2019.

The squadron was first constituted during World War II, with bombardment and fighter roles—as the 383rd and 529th, respectively—until being inactivated in January 1946. It was then allotted to the New Hampshire Air National Guard as the 133rd Fighter Squadron in May 1946, being activated the following April. From 1960 until 1975, the 133rd went through several operational changes: air transport, military airlift, tactical airlift, and finally aerial refueling, which remains its current mission. The 133rd has been federalized and ordered to active service several times; 1951–52, 1961–62, and 1990–91.

History

World War II
Trained with V-72 Vengeance aircraft. Moved to India, via Australia, July–September 1943. Assigned to Tenth Air Force. Operating from India and using A-36A Apaches. The 529th Fighter Squadron having its markings as black vertical bands painted on a yellow tail. The red nose was also a squadron marking. Many planes of the squadron had a girl's name on the nose but very few had any artwork.

The squadron supported Allied ground forces in northern Burma; covered bombers that attacked Rangoon, Insein, and other targets; bombed enemy airfields at Myitkyina and Bhamo; and conducted patrol and reconnaissance missions to help protect transport planes that flew The Hump route between India and China.

Converted to P-51C Mustangs in May 1944. Moved to Burma in July and continued to support ground forces, including Merrill's Marauders; also flew numerous sweeps over enemy airfields in central and southern Burma.

Moved to China in August 1944 and assigned to Fourteenth Air Force. Escorted bombers, flew interception missions, struck the enemy's communications, and supported ground operations, serving in combat until the end of the war. Ferried P-51's from India for Chinese Air Force in November 1945. Returned to the US in December 1945.

Inactivated on 6 January 1946.

New Hampshire Air National Guard

The wartime 529th Fighter Squadron was re-designated as the 133rd Fighter Squadron, and was allotted to the New Hampshire Air National Guard, on 24 May 1946. It was organized at Grenier Field, Manchester, New Hampshire, and was extended federal recognition on 4 April 1947 by the National Guard Bureau.  The 134th was equipped with F-47D Thunderbolts and was assigned to the Maine ANG 101st Fighter Group.

On 1 December 1948, under the command of First Air Force and Air Defense Command of the U.S. Army Air Force, the entire 101st was transferred to the Continental Air Command (CONAC) shortly after the U.S. Air Force was established on 18 September 1947 as a separate branch of the Armed Forces.

Air Defense Command

The mission of the 133rd Fighter Squadron was the air defense of New Hampshire. With the surprise invasion of South Korea on 25 June 1950, and the regular military's complete lack of readiness, most of the Air National Guard was federalized placed on active duty.  The 133rd was federalized on 10 February 1951 and assigned to the federalized Maine ANG 101st Fighter-Interceptor Wing, although it initially remained stationed at Grenier AFB, mostly flying gunnery practice missions. Its mission was expanded to include the air defense of New England, although a majority of officers and a substantial number of airmen saw duty overseas in different theaters of operations including Korean combat missions. The squadron was then attached to the Air Defense Command 23rd Fighter-Interceptor Wing at Presque Isle AFB, Maine, on 1 April 1951 with no change of mission. It was reassigned to the 4711th Defense Wing on 6 February 1952 at Presque Isle AFB.  It was released from active duty and returned to the control of the State of New Hampshire on 1 November 1952.

With the end of the Korean War, the squadron's aircraft were first upgraded to F-51H Mustangs then to the F-94 Starfire on 16 June 1954. With the 101st FIG consisting of Maine, New Hampshire, and Vermont Air Guard units, the group began holding summer camp at Otis Air Force Base after they began flying F-94s. New Hampshire's planes flew much more than those of Maine and Vermont. They logged 675 hours and a total of 752 pilot hours, which is approximately 250 more than the other two states.

The mission of the 133rd was to provide front line defense for the United States and to intercept aircraft not readily identifiable by radar or pre-filed flight plan. The radar detection station at North Truro Air Force Station, Massachusetts, was ready to make detection and calls for a scramble. Within three minutes the 133rd could be airborne and heading for a prospective rendezvous point. After identifying any intruders, the interceptor aircraft were supposed to radio back to North Truro for further instructions. From October 1954 until 30 June 1956 the 133rd maintained a dawn to dusk runway alert.

On 1 May 1956 the 134th was authorized to expand to a group level, and the 101st Fighter-Interceptor Group from the Vermont Air National Guard was transferred to New Hampshire state control, being re-designated the 101st Fighter Group (Air Defense), and federally recognized by the National Guard Bureau; the 134th FIS becoming the group's flying squadron. Other squadrons assigned into the group were the 101st Headquarters, 101st Material Squadron (Maintenance), 101st Combat Support Squadron, and the 101st USAF Dispensary.

By April 1958, the 101st counted nearly 700 officers and airmen. It was now re-equipped with 24 F-86L Sabre Interceptor jets, a dedicated swept-wing interceptor which was capable of being directed to intercept targets by Ground Control Interceptor (GCI) radar stations. The rocket-firing aircraft boasted  speed, superb maneuverability, and a  range. More than a dozen were in place by May. The old F-94s were shipped to other states for training purposes.

Airlift mission
On 1 September 1960 the unit became part of the USAF's Military Air Transport Service (MATS). The 133rd exchanged its recently acquired Sabres for eight Boeing C-97 Stratofreighter aircraft. Organizationally, the 101st Fighter Group (AD) was transferred to the Maine Air National Guard, the 157th Air Transportation Group being established by the National Guard Bureau as a new unit, replacing the 101st. The lineage and history, however, of the 101st Fighter Group (AD) were transferred to the 157th ATS and the 133rd being re-designated as an Air Transportation Squadron.

With the transfer of the 101st to Maine, the 157th ATG became one of three groups assigned to the 133rd Air Transportation Wing, Minnesota Air National Guard. Completing the organization were the 157th Group Headquarters, the 133rd Air Transport Squadron, 157th Air Base Squadron, 157th Consolidated Aircraft Maintenance Squadron, the 157th USAF Dispensary, and State Headquarters.

1961 Berlin Airlift

On the night of 13 August 1961, the East German government erected barbed wire barriers around the  periphery of West Berlin. Without warning East Berliners had been denied passage rights to the western part of the city by their own soldiers.  In response, President John F. Kennedy federalized several Air National Guard units, including the New Hampshire Air National Guard, and the 133rd ATS was placed on active duty.  Equipped with eight C-97 aircraft and manned with 675 guardsmen, the unit would stay at Grenier Field during the crisis. But its aircraft and crews ranged throughout the world—touching down at bases in Europe, South America, Alaska, Japan, the Philippines, and Southeast Asia. These missions came in addition to the ongoing ferrying of life-sustaining supplies to West Berlin.  The 157th also airlifted elements of the Turkish Army to South Korea and delivered essential communications equipment to South Vietnam.

Typical of the C-97 flights leaving Grenier AFB was one that departed in early November 1961. Its long itinerary started with a stop at Dover AFB, Delaware, then it was on to Lajes Field, Azores; Châteauroux-Déols AB, France; Rhein-Main AB, West Germany; RAF Mildenhall, England; Keflavik Airport, Iceland; Ernest Harmon AFB, Newfoundland, and back to Grenier AFB. This 9,000-plus¬mile flight required in excess of 40 hours of flying time and was supported by a crew of eight.

In 11 months, the crisis cooled and on 31 August 1962 the 900 officers and airmen of the 157th Air Transport Group were returned to State control.

In late 1965, at the behest of the Department of Defense and in concert with other Air National Guard and Reserve units, 157th personnel joined in "Operation Christmas Star", airlifting some 23,000 pounds of gifts to United States forces in South Vietnam. It was a presaging of the unit's active participation in the Vietnam War which would begin in 1966. With all-volunteer aircrews, the three 133rd ATS C-97s delivered 23,000 pounds of cargo, completely collected in New Hampshire, then shipped to Saigon and Da Nang between 26 November and 1 December. After Operation Christmas Star, Air National Guard support missions to South Vietnam increased.

Move to Pease AFB
On 1 January 1966, the Military Air Transport Service was discontinued, being replaced by Military Airlift Command (MAC). With the change of major command designations, the 157th was re-designated as the 157th Military Airlift Group, the 133rd as a Military Airlift Squadron.  The 157th became part of the 21st Air Force, McGuire AFB, New Jersey. But more dramatic than any previous change, the closure of Grenier AFB meant that the 157th was told to pack up and move to a new home at Pease AFB in Newington. The closure of Grenier AFB had been the result of Air Force-wide downsizing directed by Secretary of Defense Robert McNamara.

At Pease AFB, the 157th was assigned to buildings on the north side of the base. Like it or not, after 20 years on its own, the 157th was now side by side with Strategic Air Command 509th Bombardment Wing active duty personnel.  At the first drill in February 1966, in the confines of its hangar, the entire 700-man unit received a formal welcome by the 509th. During the ceremony—a reality check of sorts—base representatives explained the installation's regulations, proper wear of uniforms, and other military courtesies.

As the unit settled into a new home, the 133rd Aeromedical Evacuation flight was formed. It was composed of 13 flight nurses and 29 airmen serving as medical aide technicians. Working aboard the C-97 Stratofreighter planes assigned to the 133rd Military Airlift Squadron, New Hampshire medical crews were assigned to assist in transporting patients from both Europe and Southeast Asia.

Vietnam War

By March 1966, the 157th began regular logistical support for the burgeoning American Forces in South Vietnam. During the next five years, 157th aircrews averaged two flights a month to Tan Son Nhut Air Base, Cam Ranh Air Base, and Da Nang Air Base in South Vietnam as well as to other USAF-controlled bases in Southeast Asia, transporting air freight and military personnel on globe-circling trips which took Guardsmen away from their homes and jobs for 10- to 20-day periods.  Each mission from New Hampshire to South Vietnam could become an air marathon of sorts. During one flight, the trip lasted almost 11 days, as the 133rd flew from Pease AFB to Dover AFB, Delaware, where cargo was loaded. Next it was on to the West Coast, then Hawaii, Wake Island, Guam, the Philippines, and finally, South Vietnam.  To help exhausted combat troops get their R&R, the Air National Guard, including the 157th, flew more than 110,000 military personnel throughout the U.S. and overseas. In the 1,352 "Combat Leave" missions logged, approximately 38,300 military personnel were transported from Southeast Asia to the states and back again.

In December 1967, the 157th again changed aircraft, exchanging its C-97 Stratofreighters for the larger and slower C-124C Globemaster II. The C-124 had been the cargo workhorse of the Air Force since the Korean War.  The first of the C-124s arrived on 9 February 1968. By late fall, the ninth and last Globemaster touched down and crew transitioning was well underway. By September 1969 the Group had retrained its pilots to the new aircraft and completed its first Operational Readiness Inspection as a C-124 unit, qualifying to resume global airlift support.

The 157th hauled much large "out-size" cargo such as trucks, military vehicles, and missile components. It also carried troops and cargo that didn't require the speedy capability of MAC's all-jet C-141 Starlifter and C-5A Galaxy airlift fleet.  Although two- and three-day flights within the U.S. were common, the 157th's overseas commitment was growing. In 1969 the unit transported more than 1,000 tons of cargo and 2,000 passengers, its aircrews logging 5,236 hours on 44 overseas missions to Vietnam, England, France, West Germany, Greece, Japan, Portugal, Newfoundland, Puerto Rico, and Taiwan.

Tactical airlift mission
On 6 April 1971, the Secretary of the Air Force announced the re-designation of the unit to the 157th Tactical Airlift Group. After 10 years in the airlift business, the unit assumed a new role with its seventh type aircraft—the C-130A Hercules. The 157th was also transferred to Tactical Air Command (TAC), with a mission to provide mobility and logistical support for ground forces in all types of operations. It was all part of a nationwide program involving one-third of the Air National Guard's flying units and inspired by Secretary of Defense Melvin Laird.  The C-130A was the backbone of TAC's theater airlift fleet, a medium assault transport with long range (beyond 2,000 miles), high speed (220 to 300 miles per hour), and capable of landing or taking off from a shorter runway than any comparable aircraft. The turbo-prop aircraft with its five-man crew could carry nearly 20 tons of cargo or 92 fully equipped troops, 64 paratroops or 74 litter patients and attendants.

On 8 July 1971 the first C-130A arrived from the 317th Tactical Airlift Wing, Lockbourne AFB, Ohio. About a month later on 9 August, the first C-130 flight with all-157th crew took place. By September heavy Phase I transition training was underway with both aircrew and support personnel at schools throughout the United States. By early 1972, the 133rd Tactical Airlift Squadron began Phase II (combat readiness) training, and in April, low-level flying and navigational training missions were being flown day and night along air routes crossing Maine, New Hampshire, and Massachusetts. First drops of paratroopers and cargo began in early May, and in mid-month the 157th passed a "no notice" Twelfth Air Force Management Effectiveness Inspection (MEI).

During the summer of 1973, the 157th participated in a joint Army, Air Force, and National Guard-Reserve training exercise. The U.S. Readiness Command training, code named Boldfire 1-74, was centered at Camp Joseph T. Robinson, Arkansas. During Boldfire, ground personnel were airlifted aboard the unit's C-130 aircraft to Fort Campbell, Kentucky. They remained there throughout the exercise, maintaining aircraft. 157th C-130s, in turn, dropped paratroops and equipment in support of ground forces. During this time frame, the unit also had a crew participating in Coronet Shamrock, an Air Force-wide air-drop competition. The 157th TAG crew won the preliminary competition at Ft. Campbell, earning the right to represent the ANG in further competition.

The operational honors were dampened somewhat on 12 October when the 133rd Aeromedical Evacuation Flight was inactivated. The 133rd AME Flight had been organized and federally recognized on 10 June 1961. The unit's 18 officers and 27 enlisted medical personnel would fill vacancies and augment medical services in the 157th TAC Clinic.

The Energy Crisis caught up with the 157th at the end of 1973, and all flying activity was suspended from 22 December until 7 January 1974, due to fuel shortages throughout the country. In December 1974, the Group was transferred back to Military Airlift Command (MAC) when TAC's theater transport mission were transferred to MAC.

Air refueling

Strategic Air Command

On 1 October 1975, the 157th was relieved from Military Airlift Command and transferred to Strategic Air Command (SAC), becoming a Boeing KC-135A Stratotanker unit. By the end of March 1976, the New Hampshire ANG unit had largely taken over the support of the 509th Bombardment Wing from its active-duty 34th Air Refueling Squadron which was inactivated on 31 March 1976.

By October 1976, the 157th Air Refueling Group and the 509th Bombardment Wing shared the same mission and response times, giving them a link to the "Total Force Concept". The 133rd deployed to RAF Mildenhall, England, as part of the European Tanker Task Force . Once in the UK, the unit engaged in friendly competition with active duty flyers in "Giant Voice". The 133rd was also the first ANG unit to air refuel the then-experimental B-1A bomber. A January 1977 inspection rated the 157th SAC's first Air National Guard unit to be "fully operationally ready". It became the second ANG unit in SAC history to stand alert with the active force.

By the end of 1978, the 157th Air Refueling Group was fully established as one of the "Best" in SAC.  During the latter months of 1979, aircraft from the 157th joined forces with 16 KC-135A's providing air refueling support for "Crested Cap".  This airpower exercise tested the deployment capability of Air Force fighter aircraft moving from the U.S. to Europe in support of NATO war efforts there. The 157th AREFG finished 1979 by winning the "Navigation" Trophy at Giant Voice '79, a four-month competition among SAC, TAC, ADTAC, ANG, AFRES, and RAF-manned bomber and air refueling tankers. The 157th was the first Air National Guard or Air Force Reserve unit to win a trophy in the 31-year history of the SAC competition.

During the 1980s, the 157th continued to participate in Strategic Air Command exercises like Global Shield and Giant Voice. In 1984, the 133rd converted from its aging KC-135A fleet with new fuel efficient KC-135Es and the receipt of its first Air Force Outstanding Unit Award. The wing engaged in routine worldwide deployments with its KC-135s, refueling a 12-aircraft tanker task force that refueled F-105s returning from a deployment in Denmark in August 1981's Operation "Coronet Rudder".  Less than a year later, in February 1982, 160 personnel were deployed to Andersen AFB, Guam, as part of "Pacific Sentry". This was the first time 133rd KC-135 tankers had flown 10,000 miles in support of a mission, a unit distance record. During its 15 days on Guam, the unit conducted missions to Kadena AB, Okinawa, Diego Garcia, Clark AB, Philippines, Japan, and Australia. Additionally, the 157th CES rebuilt the base fire station on Andersen AFB.

The first 157th female pilot, 1st Lt. Ellen G. Hard, began flying the KC-135E in August 1984. A resident of Arlington, Massachusetts, Hard was recommended by the NHANG for pilot school at Laughlin AFB, Texas. She had served four years of active duty as a personnel officer at Lackland AFB, Texas, and Hanscom AFB, Massachusetts. Lt. Hard trained on both the KC-135A and KC-135E models.

Pease AFB closure

In 1989, the first Base Realignment and Closure Commission recommended the closure of Pease Air Force Base. As part of the closure process, a Pease Redevelopment Commission (PRC) was established to plan the closure and redevelopment of the base.  On 1 August 1999 it was resolved that the 157th Air Refueling Group, New Hampshire ANG would remain at Pease, and the facility would be redeveloped as a civilian airport, among other planned uses by the community.

It took only two years for the active component to complete departure activities, including transferring personnel and assets to other military installations. The 509th's fleet of FB-111A bombers departed in phases from June to September 1990. The 13 KC-135A tankers assigned to the 509th transferred to Wurtsmith AFB, Michigan; Plattsburgh AFB, New York; Eaker AFB, Arkansas; Carswell AFB, Texas, and Fairchild AFB, Washington. in October 1990, the personnel of the 509th were reassigned throughout the Air Force.

Pease Airport opened for civilian use through an Airfield Joint Use Agreement with the USAF on 19 July 1991. Base Closure Law directed that the 157th ARG be consolidated into a cantonment area.  were identified and retained by the USAF for the group's continued mission. Having shared resources with an active-duty air base since 1966, the 157th would learn to adapt to providing all necessary functions for itself.

Base closure-related projects would eventually include an alert facility, dining hall, base security systems, fuels facilities, communications facility, magazine, and a vehicle maintenance facility. Utility deficiencies were so severe that the program also included the complete replacement of the power and communications distribution system, and also eventually the construction of a heat plant.

On 1 April 1991, Strategic Air Command turned control of Pease Air Force Base over to the Department of Defense, and the active military base was closed. The remaining Air National Guard portion of the now-civilian facility was renamed Pease Air National Guard Base.

1990/1991 Gulf Crisis
Early on the morning of 7 August 1990, Operation Desert Shield, a build-up of friendly forces designed to contain the spread of Iraqi aggression, began. A telephone alert asked every crew member of the 133rd Air Refueling Squadron to provide maximum availability so that an immediate response capability could be developed. All 125 Operations crew members stepped forward in voluntary support.

The unit began functioning on a 24-hour, seven-days-a-week basis. Forty-two Desert Shield missions would be flown in the month of August as the 133rd helped refuel transport aircraft and fighters heading to United States Air Forces Central (CENTAF) bases in the Middle East. Forty volunteers were placed on full active duty status for as long as needed.  Close to 100 guard members reported during the next few days as seven additional airplanes arrived TDY from Ohio, Pennsylvania, and New Jersey ANG units, together with the 157th's own KC-135E aircraft forming an Air National Guard tanker task force.  By 1 October, the 157th's heavy support of MAC flights in transit from the West Coast to bases in Saudi Arabia began to slow. The 157th became one of 12 National Guard units tasked with providing refueling support to Air Force units deployed to Saudi Arabia.

On 12 October, the 157th began deployment of its assets to Saudi Arabia to form the 1709th Air Refueling Wing (Provisional) at King Abdul Aziz Air Base, Jeddah.  Personnel and aircraft, however, were dispersed at several locations in the Middle East, including Al Banteen Air Base, Abu Dhabi, United Arab Emirates; Morón Air Base, Spain; Cairo West Airport, Egypt; and other locations.  By January 1991, the build-up of men and material in-theater was complete. Operation Desert Storm, the attack phase of the Allied plan to liberate Kuwait and destroy Iraq's army, was ready to begin. With its strategic location on the Atlantic shore, the 157th mission reverted to an "Air-Bridge" mode, refueling transiting aircraft heading across the Atlantic or inbound from RAF Mildenhall, England, which served on the other end of the transatlantic route to the Middle East.

After a short 100 hours of ground combat, Iraq's elite Republican Guard quickly collapsed and Kuwait was easily recaptured by Coalition ground forces. Emotional returns, punctuated by parades, bands, speeches, tears, and bear-hugs were commonplace in New Hampshire as they were throughout the country. Many deployed units returning from CENTAF bases stopped at Pease AGB on their way to their home bases. The 157th, its aircraft festooned with yellow ribbons painted above the boom, remained in "air-bridge" mode, supporting the returning traffic. By late April almost everyone had come home safely. There had been no casualties.

Air Mobility Command

In July 1991, 100 Russian children from the nuclear-contaminated Chernobyl area flew into Pease AGB to begin attending summer camps. The Samantha Smith Foundation flight saw a Soviet Ilyushin Il-62, technically a military aircraft, land for the first time at a SAC base. Parked just a few hundred feet away, in an ironic twist, was Air Force One. Later that year, President George H. W. Bush ordered the end of Alert Missions on 1 October, ending a 15-year base ritual.

In May 1992, with the end of the Cold War, the 157th adopted the Air Force Objective Organization plan, and the unit was re-designated as the 157th Air Refueling Wing. The 133rd was assigned to the new 157th Operations Group. A month later, on 1 June, Strategic Air Command was inactivated as part of the Air Force reorganization after the end of the Cold War. It was replaced by Air Combat Command (ACC). In 1993, ACC transferred its KC-135 tanker force to the new Air Mobility Command (AMC).

By mid-1993, the 157th was reorganizing, bringing the 157th in line with current Air Force restructuring guidelines. The 133rd's 10 KC-135E-model aircraft were replaced throughout the summer with quieter, more efficient R-models. With their new CFM-56 engines, a 50 percent decrease in noise resulted, and emissions were reduced 90 percent, while range, fuel off-load capability, and reliability were all increased. By January 1994 all the unit's KC-135's had been converted to R-Models.

The unit engaged in routine deployments and training until 1994 when the 157th began operating in the Northeast Tanker Task Force together with the Maine Air National Guard. The situation in Bosnia-Herzegovina and "Operation Deny Flight" continued to involve 157th aircraft, crews, and support personnel. In December, 52 unit members deployed with Niagara Falls' 107th Air Refueling Wing to Pisa Airport, Italy. At Pease, "Operation Phoenix Moat" missions required 157th participation to help with the flow of personnel and materiel to the area. The mission in Bosnia was renamed "Joint Endeavor" and, finally, "Decisive Endeavor," as the crisis cooled. Consolidating assets, the Air Guard left Istres AB, France, and operated exclusively out of Pisa, rotating units through on a month-to-month basis. The 157th's turn came again in October 1996, as 207 unit members swapped in and out of the Italian air base for the month.

By 1997, the 157th had already been rotating 145 members through Incirlik Air Base, Turkey, as part of "Operation Northern Watch", enforcing the no-fly zone over northern Iraq. Three months later, in February 1998, the 157th, augmented by four transient aircraft, flew 28 sorties offloading gas to an air convoy carrying Army personnel and equipment from Georgia to the theater area. In the face of mounting U.S. military might, Saddam Hussein backed down.

The year 2000 saw the 157th provide support to Operation Joint Forge as well as other operational and training missions. During Operation Joint Forge, the 157th flew 55 sorties, off-loading over one and one half million pounds of fuel to operational fighters and surveillance aircraft off the coast of the former republic of Yugoslavia.

The 157th also provided support to the Clean Hunter 2000 NATO exercise, with a deployment to Karup Air Base, Denmark. The 157th also deployed to fill Expeditionary Combat Support shortfalls for Operation Southern Watch and Operation Northern Watch, NORAD alert in Iceland and Alaska, support of NATO AWCS in Germany and individual rotations to Joint Forge in Istres, France. One such deployment involved 50 personnel in Southwest Asia during the summer, as part of an Air Expeditionary Forces deployment.

In its 2005 BRAC Recommendations, DoD recommended to realign March Air Reserve Base, California. The 163rd Air Refueling Wing (ANG) would distribute its nine KC-135R aircraft to the 157th Air Refueling Wing (ANG), Pease Air National Guard Station (three aircraft), and several other bases. Military judgment also placed additional force structure at Pease to support the Northeast Tanker Task Force and also robust the squadron to a more effective size of 12 aircraft.

KC-46 Pegasus

On 22 May 2013, Air Force officials announced the preferred and reasonable alternatives for the first KC-46 Pegasus aircraft training and main operating bases. Pease Air National Guard Base was selected as the preferred alternative for the first Air National Guard KC-46A main operating base. In August 2014, Air Force leaders announced that the 157th would become the first Air National Guard unit to equip with the KC-46A. The Pegasus was scheduled to enter the Air Force inventory during fiscal year 2019. On 31 January 2019, two KC-135Rs (58-0023 and 58-0104) permanently departed Pease in preparation for arrival of the KC-46A later in the year. The final KC-135 at Pease, 57-1419, departed on 24 March 2019, for Goldwater Air National Guard Base in Phoenix, Arizona. The first KC-46A arrived at Pease on 8 August 2019. The 12th and final KC-46A was delivered on 5 February 2021.

Accidents
May 18, 1944 Boeing-Stearman PT-17A (42-16490) Crashed in Burma. Pilot Hoy M Hensley killed

Lineage

 Constituted 383rd Bombardment Squadron (Light) on 28 January 1942
 Activated on 2 March 1942
 Redesignated 383rd Bombardment Squadron (Dive) on 27 July 1942
 Redesignated 529th Fighter Bomber Squadron on 30 September 1943
 Redesignated 529th Fighter Squadron on 30 May 1944
 Inactivated on 6 January 1946
 Redesignated 133rd Fighter Squadron, and allotted to the New Hampshire ANG, on 24 May 1946
 Extended federal recognition and activated on 4 April 1947
 Federalized and ordered to active service on: 10 February 1951
 Released from active duty and returned to New Hampshire state control, 1 November 1952
 Redesignated 133rd Fighter-Interceptor Squadron on 1 November 1952
 Redesignated 133rd Air Transport Squadron on 1 September 1960
 Federalized and ordered to active service on: 1 October 1961
 Released from active duty and returned to New Hampshire state control, 31 August 1962
 Redesignated 133rd Military Airlift Squadron on 1 January 1966
 Redesignated 133rd Tactical Airlift Squadron on 11 September 1971
 Redesignated 133rd Air Refueling Squadron on 1 October 1975
 Federalized and ordered to active service on: 12 October 1990
 Released from active duty and returned to New Hampshire state control, 31 March 1991
 Components designated as: 133rd Expeditionary Air Refueling Squadron when deployed as part of an Air and Space Expeditionary unit after June 1996.

Assignments
 311th Bombardment (later Fighter-Bomber; Fighter) Group, 2 March 1942 – 6 January 1946
 101st Fighter Group, 4 April 1947
 101st Fighter-Interceptor Wing, 10 February 1951
 Attached to: 23rd Fighter-Interceptor Wing, 1 April 1951
 23rd Fighter-Interceptor Wing
 Attached to: 4711th Defense Wing, 6 February 1952
 101st Fighter-Interceptor Group, 1 November 1952 – 30 June 1954
 101st Fighter-Interceptor Group, 1 July 1954
 101st Fighter Group (Air Defense), 14 April 1956
 157th Air Transportation Group, 1 September 1960
 157th Military Airlift Group, 8 January 1966
 157th Tactical Airlift Group, 11 September 1971
 157th Air Refueling Group, 1 October 1975
 157th Operations Group 31 May 1992 – present

Stations

 Will Rogers Field, Oklahoma, 2 March 1942
 Hunter Field, Georgia, 4 July 1942
 Waycross Army Airfield, Georgia, 22 October 1942 – 18 July 1943
 Nawadih Airfield, India, 14 September 1943
 Dinjan Airfield, India, 18 October 1943
 Detachment operated from: Kurmitola, India, 21 Oct–Nov 1943; 28 May – 11 June 1944
 Kwanghan, China, 21 October 1944
 Detachment operated from: Hsian, China, 30 October 1944 – 21 February 1945
 Pungchacheng, China, 5 May 1945

 Hsian, China, Aug 1945
 Shanghai, China, 22 Oct – 14 December 1945
 Fort Lawton, Washington, 4–6 Jan 1946
 Grenier Field, Manchester, New Hampshire, 4 April 1947
 Operated from: Presque Isle Air Force Base, Maine, 1 April 1951 – 1 November 1952
 Pease Air Force Base, New Hampshire, Jan 1966 – 31 March 1991
 Pease Air National Guard Base, Portsmouth, New Hampshire, 1 April 1991 – present

Aircraft

 V-72 Vengeance, 1942
 A-36 Apache, 1942–1944
 P-51C Mustang, 1944–1945
 F-47D Thunderbolt, 1947–1952
 F-51H Mustang, 1952–1954
 F-94A/B Starfire, 1954–1958
 F-86L Sabre Interceptor, 1958–1960

 C-97A Stratofreighter, 1960–1967
 C-124C Globemaster II, 1967–1971
 C-130A Hercules, 1971–1975
 KC-135A Stratotanker, 1975–1984
 KC-135E Stratotanker, 1984–1993
 KC-135R Stratotanker, 1993 – 24 March 2019

Aircraft flying in this unit
 KC-46A Pegasus, 8 August 2019 – present

References

 Rogers, B. (2006). United States Air Force Unit Designations Since 1978. 
 A Handbook of Aerospace Defense Organization  1946–1980, by Lloyd H. Cornett and Mildred W. Johnson, Office of History, Aerospace Defense Center, Peterson Air Force Base, Colorado
 Maurer, Maurer. Combat Squadrons of the Air Force: World War II. Maxwell Air Force Base, Alabama: Office of Air Force History, 1982.
 Granite Wings: A History of the New Hampshire Air National Guard, 1947–1998
 157th ARW website

Squadrons of the United States Air National Guard
Air refueling squadrons of the United States Air Force
Military units and formations in New Hampshire